In Lambeth (subtitled Visions from the Walled Garden of William Blake) is an album composed by John Zorn and performed by the Gnostic Trio (Bill Frisell, Carol Emanuel and Kenny Wollesen), recorded in New York City in April 2013 and released on the Tzadik label in December 2013. The album is the third by the trio following The Gnostic Preludes (2012) and The Mysteries (2013). Its title quotes from William Blake's poem Jerusalem (plate 37, line 14 - "There is a Grain of Sand in Lambeth that Satan cannot find").

Reception

Martin Schray stated "If you like Zorn’s other works in this field, you won’t go wrong on this one."

Track listing
All compositions by John Zorn
 "Tiriel" – 4:58  
 "A Morning Light" – 4:46  
 "America, a Prophecy" – 6:17  
 "Through the Looking Glass" – 3:56  
 "The Ancient of Days" – 6:55  
 "Puck" – 3:36  
 "The Minotaur" – 3:26  
 "The Night of Enitharmon's Joy" – 4:55  
 "Walled Garden" – 4:33

Personnel
Carol Emanuel – harp
Bill Frisell – guitar 
Kenny Wollesen – vibraphone, bells 
Ikue Mori – electronics (track 7)

Production
Marc Urselli – engineer, audio mixer
John Zorn and Kazunori Sugiyama – producers

References

2013 albums
John Zorn albums
Albums produced by John Zorn
Tzadik Records albums